Noir in Festival is a film noir film festival, held each December in Milan, Italy. Until 2015, it was held in Courmayeur.

References

External links
 

1991 establishments in Italy
Film festivals established in 1991
Film festivals in Italy